The men's team foil competition at the 2014 Asian Games in Goyang was held on 25 September at the Goyang Gymnasium.

Schedule
All times are Korea Standard Time (UTC+09:00)

Seeding
The teams were seeded taking into account the results achieved by competitors representing each team in the individual event.

Results

Final standing

References
Men's Team Foil Results

External links
Official website

Men foil